Vitaly Teslenko (born February 15, 1993) is a Russian professional ice hockey defenceman. He is currently playing with Amur Khabarovsk of the Kontinental Hockey League (KHL).

Teslenko made his Kontinental Hockey League debut playing with Amur Khabarovsk during the 2012–13 season.

References

External links

1993 births
Living people
Amur Khabarovsk players
Russian ice hockey defencemen
People from Angarsk
Sportspeople from Irkutsk Oblast